The Pansarvärnspjäs 1110 (Pvpj 1110) is a Swedish 90 mm  recoilless gun also widely known as Pv-1110. It entered service at the early 1960s and was phased out of service in the Swedish Army in the late 1990s after 1,600 had been produced. Some 300 weapons were transferred to Estonia, Latvia and Lithuania.

The Pvpj 1100 was typically towed by, or mounted on, a Pansarvärnspjästerrängbil 9031 Volvo truck.
From the late 1970s it has also been mounted on the Terrängbil 11 and the Bandvagn 2062 tracked carrier.

For Arctic warfare it could also be fitted to a pulka and pulled by two skiers.

The Pvpj 1110 is fitted with an optical sight and has an iron sight as backup. A modified Ag m/42 rifle is used as ranging gun under the designation Inskjutningsgevär 5110.

The type was used by the Irish Army in towed form, and experimentally fitted to the chassis of a Comet tank in place of the turret.

Ammunition
The ammunition consists of a projectile inserted into a patronhylsa m/59 brass casing to form a cartridge. The same projectiles were used in the main armament of the Infanterikanonvagn 91 although with a different casing. Pvpj1110 is designed to fire HEAT rounds with tracers. The Swedish designation for these rounds are spårljuspansarspränggranat (slpsgr).
  Spårljuspansarspränggranat m/62, a 10.7 kg HEAT round that penetrates 380 mm of rolled homogeneous armour (RHA).
 Spårljusövningsgranat m/62,  10.7 kg practice round (no explosive filling) with tracer.
  Spårljuspansarspränggranat m/77, an 11.2 kg HEAT round that penetrates 500 mm of RHA.
  Spårljuspansarspränggranat m/84, a 10 kg HEAT round that penetrates 800 mm of RHA.

Users

 
 : Estonian Defence League
  (withdrawn)
  
 : Latvian National Guard
 : Lithuanian Armed Forces.
 : Ukrainian Armed Forces.
  (withdrawn from service but kept in storage)

See also
 Carl Gustaf 8.4cm recoilless rifle
 95 S 58-61 "Musti"

References

External links

 Bofors presentation reel

Recoilless rifles
Anti-tank weapons
Weapons of Sweden